Allocca is a surname of Italian origin. Notable people with this surname include:

 Antonio Allocca (1937–2013), Italian actor
 Lucio Allocca (born 1943), Italian actor, director, and playwright

Italian-language surnames